Botifarra is a type of sausage and one of the most important dishes of the Catalan cuisine.

Botifarra is based on ancient recipes, either the Roman sausage botulu or the lucanica, made of raw pork and spices, with variants today in Italy and in the Portuguese and Brazilian linguiça.

In Colombia, Butifarras Soledeñas are a popular tradition in Soledad, Atlántico.

Varieties
Some of the most representative types are:
Raw botifarra, botifarra vermella, butifarra roja, butifarra cruda, botifarra crua, or roget. It is also known as llonganissa or longaniza in many places of the Eastern Spain. This botifarra is usually grilled or barbecued.
Black botifarra, butifarra negra or negret, containing boiled pork blood in the mixture.
Botifarra catalana, large botifarra similar to cooked ham; it may contain truffles.
Botifarra d'ou or butifarra de huevo (literally "botifarra with egg"), containing egg in the mixture, typical to be eaten on Fat Thursday, dijous gras.
White botifarra, botifarra blanca or blanquet. Its main ingredient is lean meat (carne magra). It does not contain any blood in its mixture.
Boutifarra de arroz (literally "botifarra of rice"), contains boiled rice together with meat and spices.
Obispo (meaning "bishop") and bull, as well as bisbot negre and bull negre, are thick blood botifarra varieties made with different sections of tripe. Both obispo and black botifarra are versions of black pudding.

Dishes with botifarra
Usually white botifarra and black botifarra do not need to be cooked, but they are sometimes boiled as an ingredient of escudella i carn d'olla, a traditional dish made by boiling vegetables and meat; as well as in the Catalan way of cooking fava beans.

Grilled botifarra served with white beans ( or botifarra amb mongetes) is a typical Catalan dish.

In Latin America
In South America cooked botifarra of many types are known as butifarra. In the coast of Colombia, butifarra is a dried, shorter, almost round version of the sausage eaten with bollo of yuca and lime juice.  In Argentina and Uruguay, butifarra is a very fatty, tender and whitish sausage much more like a cased pate, rioplatense butifarra is made with finely minced pork fat and meat that is cased in a soft sausage casing and boiled. In Paraguay, butifarra is a finely minced fatty chorizo that is commonly prepared in asado.

Butifarra is popular in El Salvador, also known to be found in Bolivia and Mexico.

In Tabasco, Mexico, la butifarra is a short sausage that is very popular with street vendors, made of seasoned mixed ground beef and pork, deep-fried and usually served with a stack of halved tortillas on each side.

Other uses of the term
In Peruvian cuisine, the word butifarra is used for a particular kind of ham sandwich. The Peruvian  is prepared with jamon del país, which is a regional type of ham, and not a botifarra at all.

See also
 List of sausages

References

Catalan cuisine
Catalan symbols
Colombian cuisine
Spanish sausages
Paraguayan cuisine
Argentine cuisine
Uruguayan cuisine
Cuisine of Ibiza
Sausage dishes